Euphorbia burmannii is a species of Euphorbia indigenous to Namibia and South Africa, where it is widespread in sandy soils, extending southwards to the Cape Peninsula and as far east as Grahamstown.

Description

The stems of this medium-sized (30–70 cm tall), densely-branched shrub are thin, segmented, dichotomous, and erect or spreading.

Each node, along the segmented branches, is marked with a pair of large, dark, reddish stipular glands.

It produces large numbers of small, bright yellow flowers.

Related species
This species is part of a group of closely related "stick euphorbias" including Euphorbia rhombifolia and Euphorbia tenax, which are widespread across southern Africa.

In habitat it also often grows together with the more distantly related species Euphorbia mauritanica.

References

burmannii
Flora of South Africa
Renosterveld